Bouchart is a French surname. Notable people with the surname include:

 Armand Bouchart (fl. 1190s), Knight Templar
 Natacha Bouchart (born 1963), French politician

See also
 Bochart, surname
 Bouchard, surname

French-language surnames